Yevgeniya Sergeyevna Chirikova (: born 12 November 1976 in Moscow) is a Russian environmental activist, primarily known for opposing the building of a motorway through Khimki Forest near Moscow. She has also played a prominent role in the 2011–2013 Russian protests following disputed parliamentary elections in Russia. Chirikova has also been credited with "stimulating nationwide interest in political reform". She is currently based in Estonia.

Campaigning

Chirikova has campaigned against the building of a road through Khimki Forest. She also helped convince the European Bank for Reconstruction and Development and the European Investment Bank to "shun the project".

Chirikova has been the subject of intimidation because of her campaigning. In 2011 government officials visited her, saying they had been instructed to take away her children because she was abusing them. According to Chirikova, "My reaction was completely unmitigated rage. I recorded myself describing what had happened and posted the video on the web. There were so many calls to the department that they withdrew."

Awards
In March 2011, she received the Woman of Courage Award handed over by then-US Vice President Joe Biden. On this occasion, she proposed imposing sanctions on Russian politicians including Minister of Transport Igor Levitin.

In 2012, she was a winner of the Goldman Environmental Prize, receiving a USD$150,000 prize. She has said that she will spend the money setting up a campaign group called Our Land (Russian: наша земля - Nasha Zemlya) to fight similar environmental campaigns to Khimki.

In November 2012, Foreign Policy named Yevgeniya Chirikova one of its 2012 Top 100 Global Thinkers.

Family 
Yevgeniya Chirikova is married to businessman Mikhail Matveyev. The couple has two children.

See also 
 Anti-Seliger

References

External links
 
 

1976 births
Living people
Politicians from Moscow
Russian political activists
Russian women activists
2011–2013 Russian protests
Russian environmentalists
Russian women environmentalists
Russian LGBT rights activists
Russian expatriates in Estonia
Moscow Aviation Institute alumni
Russian dissidents
Goldman Environmental Prize awardees
Russian activists against the 2022 Russian invasion of Ukraine